Manuel James Aroney AM, OBE (31 August 1932 - 15 February 2011) was an Australian academic and human rights advocate. Aroney was the only child, born on 31 August 1932, of Dimitrios and Stamatina Aronis (Aroney) who both were born in Aroniadika, Kythera, Greece. He died 15 February 2011.

References

1932 births
Australian academics
Australian people of Greek descent
Members of the Order of Australia
Officers of the Order of the British Empire
2011 deaths